Fredrick Ruhindi, more commonly known as Freddie Ruhindi or Fred Ruhindi, is a Ugandan lawyer and politician. He was Attorney General of Uganda from 1 March 2015 to 2016. Between 2 June 2006 and 28 February 2015, he served as the State Minister for Justice & Constitutional Affairs in the Ugandan Cabinet. He has served in that capacity since 2006. In the cabinet reshuffle of 16 February 2009, and that of 27 May 2011, he retained his cabinet post. He is also the elected Member of Parliament representing Nakawa Division in Kampala District.

Background and education
He was born on 29 August 1955. He attended Mbarara High School for his O-Level education, graduating with the Uganda Certificate of Education (UCE) in 1973. He studied at Ntare School for his A-Level studied, graduating with the Uganda Advanced Certificate of Education in 1975. He holds the degree of Bachelor of Laws from Makerere University. He also holds the Diploma in Legal Practice from the Law Development Centre in Kampala, Uganda's capital and largest metropolitan area. His Master of Laws degree was obtained from the University of Edinburgh.

Career
For a period of eleven years, between 1981 until 1992, Fred Ruhindi worked as a State Attorney, in the Ministry of Justice & Constitutional Affairs. He was then transferred to the Uganda Investment Authority, where he served as Corporation Secretary, from 1992 until 1999. He entered politics in 2001 and was elected to parliament to represent Nakawa Division, Kampala District. He was re-elected in 2006. He has served as State Minister for Justice & Constitutional Affairs since 2006. From June 2006 until February 2015, he also served as the Deputy Attorney General of Uganda. In a cabinet reshuffle on 1 March 2015, he was appointed the Attorney General of Uganda.

Personal information
Fred Ruhindi is widowed. He belongs to the National Resistance Movement political party. He is of the Christian faith.

See also
 Parliament of Uganda
 Cabinet of Uganda
 Nakawa Division

References

External links
 Website of the Parliament of Uganda
 Full Ministerial Cabinet List, June 2006
 Full Ministerial Cabinet List, February 2009
Full Ministerial Cabinet List, May 2011

1955 births
Living people
Members of the Parliament of Uganda
People educated at Ntare School
National Resistance Movement politicians
Makerere University alumni
Alumni of the University of Edinburgh
20th-century Ugandan lawyers
21st-century Ugandan lawyers
Attorneys General of Uganda
People educated at Mbarara High School
21st-century Ugandan politicians